The Old Queen's Head is a pub on Essex Road in Islington, London N1. Its shopfront is scheduled as "to be retained" by Islington Council. Since 2006 The Old Queens Head has been a part of The Columbo Group, owned by Steve Ball and Riz Shaikh. It is a Grade II listed building.

Listed building
The Old Queen's Head is a public house dating to about 1830; the pub front on the ground floor dates to about 1900. The interior contains some early 17th-century features from an earlier building on the site.

The three storey building is of Flemish bond yellow brick with a stucco cornice; a stepped parapet hides the pitched roof. There is a range of three windows facing Essex Road and three to Queen's Head Street; one window faces the corner, which is curved.

There is an early 17th-century moulded plaster ceiling inside the pub. The ceiling is decorated with ornamental bands around panels that contain emblems. There is a wood and stone chimneypiece of the same age. Figures on either side of the stone hearth support an entablature bearing two carved scenes. The upper part of the chimneypiece is similarly decorated, ending in a frieze and cornice.

History

The previous pub on the site was demolished in 1829. It was described by Walter Thornbury, writing in the 1870s, as

Thornbury describes the interior with the surviving fireplace in detail:

Ghosts and legends
According to Absolute Publishing's London Visitor Guide, an unattributed rumour is that The Old Queen's Head is haunted like many London pubs, supposedly by both a woman and a girl in Tudor clothes.

Thornbury, writing in 1878, also mentions the pub's alleged connection with Sir Walter Raleigh, though he denied its validity:

See also

References

Bibliography

External links

 

Grade II listed pubs in London
Pubs in the London Borough of Islington
Buildings and structures in Islington